Mass appeal as a phenomenon of mass psychology may refer to:
Argumentum ad populum, or "appeal to the masses"
having a generally appealing or popular quality, see
Mass culture
Crowd manipulation
Influencer
Mass media
Influence of mass media
Fast food, etc.

As a proper name
 Mass Appeal (play), 1980 play by Bill C. Davis
 Mass Appeal (film), 1984 screen adaptation of the play
 Mass Appeal (media), Manhattan-based magazine and media company
 "Mass Appeal" (song), hip-hop song by Gang Starr from the album Hard to Earn
 Mass Appeal: Best of Gang Starr, Gang Starr compilation album
 Massappeal, Australian hardcore punk band formed in 1985